The following table shows the yearly rankings in the marathon since 1921 (men) and 1970 (women), based on the best performance in the classic distance race of 42.195 km (26 miles 385 yards).

The data for the women's marathon from 1970 to 1979 is compiled from the Association of International Marathons and Distance Races.
All other data is compiled from the Association of Road Racing Statisticians.

Men's year rankings
Key:

Women's year rankings
Key:

See also
 National records in the marathon
 Marathon world record progression
 Masters M35 marathon world record progression
 Masters M40 marathon world record progression
 Masters M45 marathon world record progression
 Masters M50 marathon world record progression
 Masters M55 marathon world record progression
 Masters M60 marathon world record progression
 Masters M65 marathon world record progression
 Masters M70 marathon world record progression
 Masters M75 marathon world record progression
 Masters M80 marathon world record progression
 Masters M85 marathon world record progression
 Masters W35 marathon world record progression
 Masters W40 marathon world record progression
 Masters W45 marathon world record progression
 Masters W50 marathon world record progression
 Masters W55 marathon world record progression
 Masters W60 marathon world record progression
 Masters W65 marathon world record progression
 Masters W70 marathon world record progression
 Masters W75 marathon world record progression
 Masters W80 marathon world record progression
 Masters W85 marathon world record progression

References

Year rankings
Sport of athletics records